Yuzuka Inagaki is a Japanese freestyle wrestler. She won the gold medal in the women's 59kg event at the 2019 Asian Wrestling Championships held in Xi'an, China.

In the same year, at the Golden Grand Prix Ivan Yarygin 2019 held in Krasnoyarsk, Russia, she won the gold medal in the women's 59kg event. She also competed in the women's 59kg event at the 2019 World Wrestling Championships held in Nur-Sultan, Kazakhstan without winning a medal. She was eliminated in her second match by Pooja Dhanda of India.

Achievements

References

External links 
 

Living people
Year of birth missing (living people)
Place of birth missing (living people)
Japanese female sport wrestlers
Asian Wrestling Championships medalists
21st-century Japanese women